Zhongshan High School of Northeast (Hereinafter abbreviated as nezs) is a secondary school located in Heping District, Shenyang, Liaoning, China.It was the first national high school in Republic of China. Its first name is National Northeast Zhongshan High School (國立東北中山中學).Nezs is the only one middle school join in the December 9th Movement.

It was established in Peiking in 1934. The first headmaster is Li Xi'en, who is Jilin University's headmaster.1936 autumn, nezs moved to Banqiao, Nanjing because of Second Sino-Japanese War. After the war end,  in 1946, nezs moved to Shenyang, Liaoning., and then changed name to Shenyang No.39 middle school. In 1996,nezs rehabilitated the name Zhongshan High School of Northeast. In 1998,nezs become the Shenyang important middle School(沈阳市重点中学). In 1999,it became the Liaoning important school(辽宁省重点中学).

References

External links
 Zhongshan High School of Northeast  
 Zhongshan High School of Northeast  - Shenyang Department of Education 

High schools in Liaoning
Educational institutions established in 1934
1934 establishments in China
Education in Shenyang
Buildings and structures in Shenyang